Alexis Felix du Pont Sr. (April 14, 1879 – June 29, 1948) was a member of the American du Pont family who served as a vice president and director of E. I. du Pont de Nemours & Co. and a philanthropist who helped found St. Andrew's School in Middletown, Delaware.

Biography
He was born on April 14, 1879, to Francis Gurney du Pont and  Elise Wigfall Simons. He graduated from the University of Pennsylvania in 1901.

He started work at E. I. du Pont de Nemours & Co. in 1900 and was made director in 1915 and vice president in 1919.

Felix du Pont died on June 29, 1948, in Rehoboth Beach, Delaware. He was buried in Old Saint Anne's Church Cemetery in Middletown, Delaware.

Marriage
In 1902, he married Mary R. Chichester. She was the daughter of Washington Bowie Chichester of Leesburg, Virginia. On September 3, 1937, they divorced in Reno, Nevada. Later that same day he married Ann Marvel of Rehoboth Beach, Delaware. She was the daughter of Judge David Marvel of the Superior Court in Wilmington, Delaware.

Legacy
His son, Alexis Felix du Pont, Jr., co-founded the All American Aviation Company, predecessor of US Airways Group, Inc.,  which merged with AMR Corporation in 2013 to form the world's largest airline. In 1897, A. Felix du Pont, Sr. co-founded The University of Pennsylvania Band.

References

1879 births
1948 deaths
Businesspeople from Delaware
American philanthropists
Alexis Felix
University of Pennsylvania alumni
Delaware Democrats
People from Wilmington, Delaware
People from Rehoboth Beach, Delaware